József Lihi (born 12 March 1963) is a Hungarian biathlete. He competed in the 10 km sprint event at the 1984 Winter Olympics.

References

External links
 

1963 births
Living people
Hungarian male biathletes
Olympic biathletes of Hungary
Biathletes at the 1984 Winter Olympics
Sportspeople from Miskolc